La Résidence Ylang Ylang [The Ylang Ylang Residence] is a 2008 short film by Hachimiya Ahamada.

Synopsis 
A Comorian village. Djibril spends his frees time taking care of an abandoned villa. While he is busy there, his cabin catches fire. Homeless, he must find a place to live.

Awards 
 Festival del cortometraje francófono Vaulx-en-Velin 2009
 Festival internacional de cortometrajes Clermont-Ferrand 2009
 Quintessence, Ouidah IFF 2009

References

External links
 

2008 films
French short films
Comorian films
2008 short films
African short films